Onychostoma simum is a species of cyprinid in the genus Onychostoma. It inhabits China and Vietnam.

References

Cyprinid fish of Asia
Freshwater fish of China
Fish of Vietnam
IUCN Red List data deficient species
Fish described in 1873
simum